Niderviller is a commune in the Moselle department in Grand Est in north-eastern France.
It is mostly known for the Niderviller pottery, established in 1735 and still producing there.

Geography 
Niderviller is located south-east of Sarrebourg. 

The commune is served by the departmental roads 45 and 96. It is also crossed by the Marne-Rhine canal, which passes through the Niderviller Underground Tunnel.

Toponymy 
The name of the village come from the germanic words nieder  "down, from below" and weiler "hamlet".

Ancient names: Niederwilre (1163), Nyderwilre (15th century), Nyder-Wuelles (1525), Nidersweiller (1594), Niderwiller (18th century), Nidreviller (1793), Niederweiler (1871-1918).

History 
Niderviller, which was originally part of the Duchy of Lorraine, was ceded to France in 1661 (Treaty of Vincennes), along with the other localities of the provostry of Sarrebourg.

There was once a castle that belonged to General de Custine, who was killed by the revolutionaries in 1793.

In 1949, the castle was reconverted into an aerial hospital (a sort of sanatorium that uses fresh air) for sick children. It became a convalescent home for victims of cardiovascular accidents in 1982.

Sights

Religious monuments 

 Église Sainte-Croix (Church of the Holy Cross): In 1762, lord of Niderviller, Jean-Louis Beyerlé, and owner of the Niderviller pottery factory, had the present bell tower built.
 Sculpture descente de la Croix : a sculpture representing the descent from the Cross.
 War memorial

Historical monuments 
 Ruins of a Roman villa
 Castle, built around 1863 by Léopold Halphen for his son-in-law Théodore Cerfberr. Since March 1, 1982, it houses part of the Saint-Luc Specialised Rehabilitation Center in Abreschviller.
 Old castle des Custine : this castle is nowadays destroyed

Civilian and industrial buildings 
 Niderviller Pottery factory: the first factory was built in 1735. Its products are the symbol of the village.
 Tile and brick factory
 Old mill

Cultural events and festivities 
La vallée de la Bièvre en fête is a fair that highlights the culture, the crafts and the gastronomy of the local territory.

Notable people 
 Astolphe de Custine: a French artistocrat and writer who was born in Niderviller

See also 
 Communes of the Moselle department

References

External links 
 

Communes of Moselle (department)